(Roshi) Sudarshan Bhadain (GCSK) (born 25 April 1971) is a Mauritian politician

Education and Professional career
Roshi Bhadain completed his secondary education at Royal College Curepipe before studying law at University of Bristol. He also studied Accountancy before working for KPMG in England. On his return to Mauritius he worked at the Economic Crime Office (ECO) which was restructured into the Independent Commission Against Corruption (Mauritius) (ICAC). He has practised as a Barrister-at-Law in Mauritius and a Fellow Chartered Certified Accountant since 2002 in the areas of fraud, financial crime, corruption and money laundering.

Political career
At the 10 December 2014 National Assembly elections Roshi Bhadain was elected as a candidate of Alliance Lepep (MSM-PMSD-ML) in Constituency No. 18 (Belle Rose-Quatre Bornes). He was the Minister of Financial Services, Good Governance and Institutional Reforms under the government of Militant Socialist Movement. On 23 January 2017 he resigned from the MSM-ML government as he disagreed with the undue influence of vested interests on the government led by Pravind Jugnauth, following the unexpected resignation of elected Prime Minister Sir Anerood Jugnauth.

Roshi Bhadain became a back-bencher before resigning from Parliament on 16 June 2017 to highlight his opposition against the safety and financial aspects of the Metro Express project. His resignation triggered by-elections in Constituency No. 18 but he was not re-elected when by-elections were held on 17 December 2017. Since 2017 Roshi Bhadain is the leader of the Reform Party (Mauritius), which he founded after leaving Mouvement Socialiste Mauricien (MSM).

Award and Decoration 

 :
  Grand Commander of the Order of the Star and Key of the Indian Ocean (2016)

References

External links 
 
 

Members of the National Assembly (Mauritius)
Living people
Government ministers of Mauritius
Mauritian businesspeople
1971 births
20th-century Mauritian lawyers
Mauritian Hindus
Mauritian people of Indian descent
21st-century Mauritian lawyers